Bladulf (died c. 630), was a monk and priest of Bobbio Abbey, killed at the orders of the Lombard king Arioald, who was an Arian.

He is a Catholic and Orthodox saint, with his feast day on January 2.

Notes

References

External links
   Heiligenlexikon-1858 page

7th-century Christian saints
7th-century Italian people
Burials at Bobbio Abbey